The Waikikis were a Belgian studio band, mostly known for their single "Hawaii Tattoo", released in the U.S. in 1964, on Kapp Records. "Hawaii Tattoo" was recorded in 1961 in Belgium and spent two months in the Belgian chart. It was a huge hit in Germany, spending 21 weeks in the Top Ten and also reached the Top Fifty in the U.S., Canada and the UK.

The album Hawaii Tattoo reached the number 93 spot in the Billboard Hot 200 in 1965.

Behind the scenes, record producer Horst Fuchs promoted the band’s career and pulled the strings. Composers such as Jo van Wetter, Willy Albimoor, Hans Blum and Michael Thomas (Martin Böttcher) created songs like "Hawaii Tattoo", "Carnival of Venice", "Mein Hut der hat drei Ecken", "Aloha Parade", "Honolulu Parade" and "Waikiki Welcome". The Waikikis sold their gramophone records by the millions, and some of their own creations like "Hilo Kiss" or "Hula-Hochzeit" ("Hawaii Honeymoon") made their way into the charts in several countries.

In 2004 the song "Hawaiian March" was used and sampled for the ‘Prince Paul's Bubble Party’ track on the SpongeBob SquarePants Movie film soundtrack.

Discography

Albums
Christmas In Hawaii - 1964
Hawaii Tattoo - 1963
Midnight Luau - 1968
Moonlight On Diamond Head - 1969
A Taste Of Hawaii - 1966
Hawaii Beach Party - 1965
Greatest Hits From Hawaii - 1969
Pearly Shells From Hawaii - 1967
Lollipops And Roses From Hawaii - 1965
Road To Waikiki - 1964

References

External links
 Overview of Waikikis music on MusicStack.com
 Overview of Hawaiian albums

Surf music groups
Belgian rock music groups
Musical groups established in 1961
Musical groups disestablished in 1976
1961 establishments in Belgium